The Constitution Hall Park is a historical open-air museum in Huntsville, Alabama, that reenacts life in 1819. The eight buildings include a law office, print shop, land surveyor's office, post office, cabinetmaker's shop and residence. It was added to the Alabama Register of Landmarks and Heritage on October 31, 1975.

On July 5, 1819, in the vacant cabinet shop, forty-four delegates came together from the Constitutional convention to inaugurate Alabama as the twenty-second state. The Alabama Constitution Village is part of the Earlyworks Museum Complex, along with the Huntsville Depot and EarlyWorks Children's History Museum.

Events
The Alabama Constitution Village hosts an annual Santa's Village event which was named the Alabama event of the Year in 2006. In 2004 and 2005 the event was cited as a Top 20 event by the Southeastern Tourism Society.

References

External links
Earlyworks Museum Complex

History of Huntsville, Alabama
Buildings and structures in Huntsville, Alabama
Living museums in Alabama
Museums in Huntsville, Alabama
History museums in Alabama
Properties on the Alabama Register of Landmarks and Heritage
Open-air museums in Alabama